Robyn Lambourne (née Friday, born 24 July 1964, in Narrogin, Australia) was a successful female squash player brought up in Australia. In 1991, she was ranked as the number 2 player in the world, her highest career singles rankings. 

She became a Junior Squash world champion in the women's individual event defeating her Australian compatriot Helen Paradeiser in the finals at the 1983 World Junior Squash Championships. Robyn Lambourne also became the first Australian to win a Junior Squash World Championship title.

Her greatest success came in 1992 when she was part of the winning Australian team during the 1992 Women's World Team Squash Championships held in Vancouver, Canada. And her career ended shortly after that.

References 

1964 births
Living people
Australian female squash players